Judge Faith is a syndicated American arbitration-based reality court show presided over by former Manhattan Assistant District Attorney Faith Jenkins. The show premiered on September 22, 2014 and ran for 4 seasons until its cancellation on May 21, 2018.

Judge Faith is produced by The Tornante Company and Trifecta Entertainment. Trifecta also handles all distribution and ad sales for the show.

The court show ended production in 2018. Jenkins took over judge duties for Divorce Court two years after Judge Faith ended its run.

References

External links
 Faith Jenkins website 
 Judge Faith official website

2010s American reality television series
2014 American television series debuts
Court shows
Television series by The Tornante Company
2018 American television series endings